2020 Malaysia Premier Futsal League is the 2nd season of the Malaysia Premier Futsal League. It is the Malaysian professional futsal league for association football clubs, since its establishment in 2004. Selangor are the defending champions.

Team changes

New teams
 Sarawak
 Kelantan
 Negeri Sembilan
 KPM-PST Mustangs

Withdrawn teams
 Melaka United

Teams
For 2020 season, a total of 12 clubs compete in league.

League table

Result table

References

External links
 Football Association of Malaysia website
 Stadium Astro website

Liga Futsal Kebangsaan seasons
2020 in Malaysian football
2020 in Asian futsal